This is a list of Welsh people who have become boxing world champions as recognised by the International Boxing Federation (IBF), World Boxing Organization (WBO), World Boxing Association (WBA), World Boxing Council (WBC) or The Ring magazine.

List of Welsh boxing world champions

References 

Sport in Wales
Lists of world boxing champions